The Qatar Stars League clubs in the AFC Champions League.This details the participation and performances in the competition since its based at 2002 as a result of the merger between the Asian Club Championship, the Asian Cup Winners' Cup and the Asian Super Cup.

Participations
 Q : Qualified, PO = Play-off stage, GS : Group Stage, R16 : Round of 16, QF : Quarterfinals, SF : Semifinals, RU : Runners-Up, W : Winners

Overall statistics

Statistics by season

Finals

Statistics by club

Al Gharafa

Al Rayyan

Qatar SC

See also 
 Australian clubs in the AFC Champions League
 Chinese clubs in the AFC Champions League
 Indian football clubs in Asian competitions
 Indonesian football clubs in Asian competitions
 Iranian clubs in the AFC Champions League
 Iraqi clubs in the AFC Champions League
 Japanese clubs in the AFC Champions League
 Myanmar clubs in the AFC Champions League
 Saudi Arabian clubs in the AFC Champions League
 South Korean clubs in the AFC Champions League
 Thai clubs in the AFC Champions League
 Vietnamese clubs in the AFC Champions League

External links
 AFC Champions League official website
 AFC Champions League on RSSSF

Football in Qatar
Qatari football clubs in international competitions
Football clubs in the AFC Champions League